In enzymology, an arabinose-5-phosphate isomerase is an enzyme that catalyzes the chemical reaction

D-arabinose 5-phosphate  D-ribulose 5-phosphate

Hence, this enzyme has one substrate, D-arabinose 5-phosphate, and one product, D-ribulose 5-phosphate.

This enzyme belongs to the family of isomerases, specifically those intramolecular oxidoreductases interconverting aldoses and ketoses.  The systematic name of this enzyme class is D-arabinose-5-phosphate aldose-ketose-isomerase. Other names in common use include arabinose phosphate isomerase, phosphoarabinoisomerase, and D-arabinose-5-phosphate ketol-isomerase.

References

 

EC 5.3.1
Enzymes of unknown structure